Pardosa danica is a wolf spider species endemic to Mols Bjerge in Denmark. It is only known from a single specimen that was found in 1883 and currently is on display at the Copenhagen Zoological Museum. The exact site where it was found was covered in heathers, but is now covered with bushes and trees. However, significant patches of heathers remain nearby. Wolf spiders are generally quite conspicuous and the spider fauna of Mols Bjerge has been intensely studied. Its apparent disappearance is a mystery and it is considered possibly extinct.

See also 
 List of Lycosidae species

References

External links 

danica
Endemic fauna of Denmark
Spiders of Europe
Spiders described in 1904